Jan Souček (born November 20, 1978) is a Czech sprint canoer who competed in the early 2000s. He won a bronze medal in the K-4 1000 m event at the 2010 ICF Canoe Sprint World Championships in Poznań.

At the 2000 Summer Olympics in Sydney, Souček was disqualified in the semifinals of the K-2 1000 m event.

References
Sports-Reference.com profile

1978 births
Canoeists at the 2000 Summer Olympics
Czech male canoeists
Living people
Olympic canoeists of the Czech Republic
ICF Canoe Sprint World Championships medalists in kayak